The Shaw Centre (formerly the Ottawa Convention Centre) is a convention centre located in the downtown core of Ottawa, Ontario, Canada. It opened in April 2011.  The award-winning architecture was designed by Ritchard Brisbin (bbb architects Ottawa). The Centre replaces the Ottawa Congress Centre, which opened in 1983 and is built on the site of the Ottawa Congress Centre building which was demolished in 2008–2009.

In October 2014, the Ottawa Convention Centre and Shaw Communications entered a ten-year naming right agreement that saw the venue renamed to the Shaw Centre. The centre is located on Colonel By Drive, just south of Rideau Street. The facility is owned by the Ontario provincial government.

Facility floor plan
The Shaw Centre has four levels, each with a view of the Rideau Canal and Downtown Ottawa. The first level features a large lobby, as well as the Wall of Three Rivers artwork, which is made of reclaimed logs and acts as a tribute to Ottawa history. This floor consists of eight meeting rooms, an executive boardroom, a coat room, a kitchen studio, administration and direct indoor access to parking lots. The second level consists of 15 meeting rooms, a pre-function area of over 19,806 sq. ft. / 1,840 sq. m., a dedicated show office, a corporate business centre, a coat room, and bridges that link the Shaw Centre to the Westin Hotel and the Rideau Centre. The third level is a large multipurpose hall and can accommodate up to 6,260 people theatre-style, 4,600 people banquet-style, or up to 400 10'x10' booth displays. The fourth level is a ballroom, reserved for meetings, conferences, or weddings.

Awards and certifications
The Shaw Centre was built to be as environmentally friendly as possible, and in January 2013, was awarded LEED Gold certification. LEED (Leadership in Energy and Environmental Design) is a green building rating system developed by the U.S. Green Building Council in 1998. It is based on a points system, which then places the building in one of four categories – Certified, Silver, Gold, and Platinum – the latter being the highest achievement of environmental friendliness. There are 70 possible LEED points that can be earned. These points are divided into five different categories: Sustainable Site Development, Water Efficiency, Energy Efficiency, Material Selection and Indoor Environmental Quality. The OCC saves 969,000 gallons of water each year by harvesting rainwater from the roof, which is stored in a cistern below the building. This water is used to flush restroom toilets. 97% of materials from the demolished Congress Centre were diverted from landfill. The Shaw Centre used recycled steel to build the roof trusses, and logs from the bottom of the Ottawa River to make the Wall of Three Rivers. Because of its panoramic glass design, the OCC saves energy by letting in natural daylight.

In May 2013, the Shaw Centre achieved AIPC Quality Standards Gold Certification with the successful completion of an audit by the designated external auditor for AIPC (International Association of Congress Centres). The Shaw Centre joined a group of 20 AIPC convention centres worldwide that have successfully achieved this level of international certification.

In July 2014, the Shaw Centre finished in a tie for second place for the title of "World's Best Convention Centre", an award handed out by the International Association of Congress Centres (AIPC). The Shaw Centre was among 27 finalists vying for the award at the 2014 AIPC Annual Conference in Berlin, Germany. The Cairns Convention Centre (Australia) won the title, followed by the Ottawa Convention Centre and the Palais des congrès de Montréal.

Construction

The cost was shared by three levels of government.  came from the Canadian government,  from the Ontario government, $40 million from the City of Ottawa and the remainder of $30 million was borrowed by the centre itself.

The new building was designed by Ritchard Brisbin (bbb architects Ottawa) and features an iconic curved glass facade on the Colonel By Drive front. From the outside, the entrance from the street is clearly visible and the internal escalators are also visible. While it has four levels of convention space, it is seven storeys in height.

As part of the new project, the name was changed to the Ottawa Convention Centre. According to the centre's chairman, the former title of "congress" was confusing to American convention planners.

Congress Centre
The previous Congress Centre building was designed by Bemi & Associates Architects in 1982. It had  of exhibition space. The building was built on former railways lands, vacated when the main Ottawa train station was moved to Alta Vista Drive outside of downtown. The building was opened by Prime Minister Pierre Trudeau.

The previous Congress Centre was used for conventions, public exhibitions and music concerts. It could support audience sizes of up to a few thousand.

Events
National Career Development Conference - January 2014

References

External links

Buildings and structures completed in 2011
Music venues in Ottawa
Convention centres in Canada
Tourist attractions in Ottawa
Shaw Communications
2011 establishments in Ontario